Rushout is a surname. Notable people with the surname include:

Anne Rushout ( 1767–1849), English watercolorist and diarist
John Rushout (disambiguation), multiple people
Sir James Rushout, 1st Baronet, English landowner and politician
Rushout baronets
George Rushout, 3rd Baron Northwick, British politician